This is a list of moths of families starting from I to O that are found in Metropolitan France (including Corsica). It also acts as an index to the species articles and forms part of the full List of Lepidoptera of Metropolitan France.

Family Incurvariidae

Alloclemensia mesospilella (Herrich-Schaffer, 1854)
Crinopteryx familiella Peyerimhoff, 1871
Incurvaria koerneriella (Zeller, 1839)
Incurvaria masculella (Denis & Schiffermuller, 1775)
Incurvaria oehlmanniella (Hübner, 1796)
Incurvaria pectinea Haworth, 1828
Incurvaria ploessli Huemer, 1993
Incurvaria praelatella (Denis & Schiffermuller, 1775)
Paraclemensia cyanella (Zeller, 1850)
Phylloporia bistrigella (Haworth, 1828)

Family Lasiocampidae

Cosmotriche lobulina (Denis & Schiffermuller, 1775)
Dendrolimus pini (Linnaeus, 1758)
Eriogaster arbusculae Freyer, 1849
Eriogaster catax (Linnaeus, 1758)
Eriogaster lanestris (Linnaeus, 1758)
Eriogaster rimicola (Denis & Schiffermuller, 1775)
Euthrix potatoria (Linnaeus, 1758)
Gastropacha quercifolia (Linnaeus, 1758)
Gastropacha populifolia (Denis & Schiffermuller, 1775)
Lasiocampa quercus (Linnaeus, 1758)
Lasiocampa trifolii (Denis & Schiffermuller, 1775)
Macrothylacia rubi (Linnaeus, 1758)
Malacosoma castrensis (Linnaeus, 1758)
Malacosoma neustria (Linnaeus, 1758)
Malacosoma alpicola Staudinger, 1870
Malacosoma franconica (Denis & Schiffermuller, 1775)
Odonestis pruni (Linnaeus, 1758)
Pachypasa limosa (de Villiers, 1827)
Phyllodesma suberifolia (Duponchel, 1842)
Phyllodesma ilicifolia (Linnaeus, 1758)
Phyllodesma kermesifolia (Lajonquiere, 1960)
Phyllodesma tremulifolia (Hübner, 1810)
Poecilocampa alpina (Frey & Wullschlegel, 1874)
Poecilocampa populi (Linnaeus, 1758)
Psilogaster loti (Ochsenheimer, 1810)
Trichiura ilicis (Rambur, 1866)
Trichiura castiliana Spuler, 1908
Trichiura crataegi (Linnaeus, 1758)

Family Lecithoceridae

Eurodachtha canigella (Caradja, 1920)
Eurodachtha pallicornella (Staudinger, 1859)
Eurodachtha siculella (Wocke, 1889)
Homaloxestis briantiella (Turati, 1879)
Lecithocera anatolica Gozmany, 1978
Lecithocera nigrana (Duponchel, 1836)
Odites kollarella (O. G. Costa, 1832)

Family Limacodidae

Apoda limacodes (Hufnagel, 1766)
Heterogenea asella (Denis & Schiffermuller, 1775)
Hoyosia codeti (Oberthur, 1883)

Family Lyonetiidae

Leucoptera aceris (Fuchs, 1903)
Leucoptera calycotomella Amsel, 1939
Leucoptera coronillae (M. Hering, 1933)
Leucoptera genistae (M. Hering, 1933)
Leucoptera laburnella (Stainton, 1851)
Leucoptera lotella (Stainton, 1859)
Leucoptera lustratella (Herrich-Schaffer, 1855)
Leucoptera malifoliella (O. Costa, 1836)
Leucoptera onobrychidella Klimesch, 1937
Leucoptera sinuella (Reutti, 1853)
Leucoptera spartifoliella (Hübner, 1813)
Leucoptera zanclaeella (Zeller, 1848)
Lyonetia clerkella (Linnaeus, 1758)
Lyonetia ledi Wocke, 1859
Lyonetia prunifoliella (Hübner, 1796)
Phyllobrostis daphneella Staudinger, 1859
Phyllobrostis eremitella de Joannis, 1912
Phyllobrostis fregenella Hartig, 1941
Phyllobrostis hartmanni Staudinger, 1867

Family Lypusidae

Amphisbatis incongruella (Stainton, 1849)
Lypusa maurella (Denis & Schiffermuller, 1775)
Pseudatemelia colurnella (Mann, 1867)
Pseudatemelia filiella (Staudinger, 1859)
Pseudatemelia flavifrontella (Denis & Schiffermuller, 1775)
Pseudatemelia fuscifrontella (Constant, 1885)
Pseudatemelia latipennella (Jackh, 1959)
Pseudatemelia lavandulae (Mann, 1855)
Pseudatemelia subgilvida (Walsingham, 1901)
Pseudatemelia subochreella (Doubleday, 1859)
Pseudatemelia synchrozella (Jackh, 1959)
Pseudatemelia josephinae (Toll, 1956)
Pseudatemelia langohri E. Palm, 1990

Family Micropterigidae

Micropterix aglaella (Duponchel, 1838)
Micropterix allionella (Fabricius, 1794)
Micropterix aruncella (Scopoli, 1763)
Micropterix aureatella (Scopoli, 1763)
Micropterix aureoviridella (Hofner, 1898)
Micropterix calthella (Linnaeus, 1761)
Micropterix huemeri M. A. Kurz, M. E. Kurz & Zeller-Lukashort, 2003
Micropterix mansuetella Zeller, 1844
Micropterix osthelderi Heath, 1975
Micropterix paykullella (Fabricius, 1794)
Micropterix rothenbachii Frey, 1856
Micropterix schaefferi Heath, 1975
Micropterix sicanella Zeller, 1847
Micropterix trifasciella Heath, 1965
Micropterix tunbergella (Fabricius, 1787)

Family Millieridae

Millieria dolosalis (Heydenreich, 1851)

Family Momphidae

Mompha langiella (Hübner, 1796)
Mompha idaei (Zeller, 1839)
Mompha miscella (Denis & Schiffermuller, 1775)
Mompha bradleyi Riedl, 1965
Mompha conturbatella (Hübner, 1819)
Mompha divisella Herrich-Schaffer, 1854
Mompha epilobiella (Denis & Schiffermuller, 1775)
Mompha jurassicella (Frey, 1881)
Mompha lacteella (Stephens, 1834)
Mompha ochraceella (Curtis, 1839)
Mompha propinquella (Stainton, 1851)
Mompha sturnipennella (Treitschke, 1833)
Mompha subbistrigella (Haworth, 1828)
Mompha locupletella (Denis & Schiffermuller, 1775)
Mompha raschkiella (Zeller, 1839)
Mompha terminella (Humphreys & Westwood, 1845)
Urodeta hibernella (Staudinger, 1859)

Family Nepticulidae

Acalyptris minimella (Rebel, 1924)
Acalyptris platani (Muller-Rutz, 1934)
Bohemannia auriciliella (de Joannis, 1908)
Bohemannia pulverosella (Stainton, 1849)
Bohemannia quadrimaculella (Boheman, 1853)
Ectoedemia agrimoniae (Frey, 1858)
Ectoedemia albifasciella (Heinemann, 1871)
Ectoedemia algeriensis van Nieukerken, 1985
Ectoedemia andalusiae van Nieukerken, 1985
Ectoedemia angulifasciella (Stainton, 1849)
Ectoedemia arcuatella (Herrich-Schaffer, 1855)
Ectoedemia argyropeza (Zeller, 1839)
Ectoedemia atricollis (Stainton, 1857)
Ectoedemia caradjai (Groschke, 1944)
Ectoedemia erythrogenella (de Joannis, 1908)
Ectoedemia hannoverella (Glitz, 1872)
Ectoedemia haraldi (Soffner, 1942)
Ectoedemia hendrikseni A.Lastuvka, Z. Lastuvka & van Nieukerken, 2010
Ectoedemia heringella (Mariani, 1939)
Ectoedemia heringi (Toll, 1934)
Ectoedemia hexapetalae (Szocs, 1957)
Ectoedemia ilicis (Mendes, 1910)
Ectoedemia intimella (Zeller, 1848)
Ectoedemia mahalebella (Klimesch, 1936)
Ectoedemia minimella (Zetterstedt, 1839)
Ectoedemia occultella (Linnaeus, 1767)
Ectoedemia pubescivora (Weber, 1937)
Ectoedemia quinquella (Bedell, 1848)
Ectoedemia rosae Van Nieukerken, 2011
Ectoedemia rubivora (Wocke, 1860)
Ectoedemia rufifrontella (Caradja, 1920)
Ectoedemia spinosella (de Joannis, 1908)
Ectoedemia subbimaculella (Haworth, 1828)
Ectoedemia suberis (Stainton, 1869)
Ectoedemia turbidella (Zeller, 1848)
Ectoedemia decentella (Herrich-Schaffer, 1855)
Ectoedemia louisella (Sircom, 1849)
Ectoedemia obtusa (Puplesis & Diskus, 1996)
Ectoedemia sericopeza (Zeller, 1839)
Ectoedemia euphorbiella (Stainton, 1869)
Ectoedemia septembrella (Stainton, 1849)
Ectoedemia weaveri (Stainton, 1855)
Ectoedemia amani Svensson, 1966
Ectoedemia atrifrontella (Stainton, 1851)
Ectoedemia hispanica van Nieukerken, 1985
Ectoedemia liebwerdella Zimmermann, 1940
Ectoedemia liguricella Klimesch, 1953
Ectoedemia longicaudella Klimesch, 1953
Enteucha acetosae (Stainton, 1854)
Parafomoria cistivora (Peyerimhoff, 1871)
Parafomoria fumanae A. & Z. Lastuvka, 2005
Parafomoria halimivora van Nieukerken, 1985
Parafomoria helianthemella (Herrich-Schaffer, 1860)
Parafomoria liguricella (Klimesch, 1946)
Parafomoria pseudocistivora van Nieukerken, 1983
Simplimorpha promissa (Staudinger, 1871)
Stigmella aceris (Frey, 1857)
Stigmella aeneofasciella (Herrich-Schaffer, 1855)
Stigmella alaternella (Le Marchand, 1937)
Stigmella alnetella (Stainton, 1856)
Stigmella anomalella (Goeze, 1783)
Stigmella assimilella (Zeller, 1848)
Stigmella atricapitella (Haworth, 1828)
Stigmella aurella (Fabricius, 1775)
Stigmella auromarginella (Richardson, 1890)
Stigmella basiguttella (Heinemann, 1862)
Stigmella betulicola (Stainton, 1856)
Stigmella carpinella (Heinemann, 1862)
Stigmella catharticella (Stainton, 1853)
Stigmella centifoliella (Zeller, 1848)
Stigmella confusella (Wood & Walsingham, 1894)
Stigmella continuella (Stainton, 1856)
Stigmella crataegella (Klimesch, 1936)
Stigmella desperatella (Frey, 1856)
Stigmella diniensis (Klimesch, 1975)
Stigmella dorsiguttella (Johansson, 1971)
Stigmella dryadella (O. Hofmann, 1868)
Stigmella eberhardi (Johansson, 1971)
Stigmella floslactella (Haworth, 1828)
Stigmella freyella (Heyden, 1858)
Stigmella glutinosae (Stainton, 1858)
Stigmella hemargyrella (Kollar, 1832)
Stigmella hybnerella (Hübner, 1796)
Stigmella ilicifoliella (Mendes, 1918)
Stigmella incognitella (Herrich-Schaffer, 1855)
Stigmella lapponica (Wocke, 1862)
Stigmella lemniscella (Zeller, 1839)
Stigmella lonicerarum (Frey, 1856)
Stigmella luteella (Stainton, 1857)
Stigmella magdalenae (Klimesch, 1950)
Stigmella malella (Stainton, 1854)
Stigmella mespilicola (Frey, 1856)
Stigmella microtheriella (Stainton, 1854)
Stigmella minusculella (Herrich-Schaffer, 1855)
Stigmella myrtillella (Stainton, 1857)
Stigmella nylandriella (Tengstrom, 1848)
Stigmella obliquella (Heinemann, 1862)
Stigmella oxyacanthella (Stainton, 1854)
Stigmella paradoxa (Frey, 1858)
Stigmella perpygmaeella (Doubleday, 1859)
Stigmella plagicolella (Stainton, 1854)
Stigmella prunetorum (Stainton, 1855)
Stigmella pyri (Glitz, 1865)
Stigmella regiella (Herrich-Schaffer, 1855)
Stigmella rhamnella (Herrich-Schaffer, 1860)
Stigmella roborella (Johansson, 1971)
Stigmella rolandi van Nieukerken, 1990
Stigmella ruficapitella (Haworth, 1828)
Stigmella sakhalinella Puplesis, 1984
Stigmella salicis (Stainton, 1854)
Stigmella samiatella (Zeller, 1839)
Stigmella sorbi (Stainton, 1861)
Stigmella speciosa (Frey, 1858)
Stigmella splendidissimella (Herrich-Schaffer, 1855)
Stigmella stelviana (Weber, 1938)
Stigmella suberivora (Stainton, 1869)
Stigmella svenssoni (Johansson, 1971)
Stigmella thuringiaca (Petry, 1904)
Stigmella tiliae (Frey, 1856)
Stigmella tityrella (Stainton, 1854)
Stigmella tormentillella (Herrich-Schaffer, 1860)
Stigmella trimaculella (Haworth, 1828)
Stigmella ulmivora (Fologne, 1860)
Stigmella vimineticola (Frey, 1856)
Stigmella viscerella (Stainton, 1853)
Stigmella zangherii (Klimesch, 1951)
Trifurcula alypella Klimesch, 1975
Trifurcula bleonella (Chretien, 1904)
Trifurcula bupleurella (Chretien, 1907)
Trifurcula headleyella (Stainton, 1854)
Trifurcula lavandulae Z. & A. Lastuvka, 2007
Trifurcula magna A. & Z. Lastuvka, 1997
Trifurcula melanoptera van Nieukerken & Puplesis, 1991
Trifurcula rosmarinella (Chretien, 1914)
Trifurcula saturejae (Parenti, 1963)
Trifurcula stoechadella Klimesch, 1975
Trifurcula teucriella (Chretien, 1914)
Trifurcula thymi (Szocs, 1965)
Trifurcula cryptella (Stainton, 1856)
Trifurcula eurema (Tutt, 1899)
Trifurcula ortneri (Klimesch, 1951)
Trifurcula aurella Rebel, 1933
Trifurcula calycotomella A. & Z. Lastuvka, 1997
Trifurcula coronillae van Nieukerken, 1990
Trifurcula immundella (Zeller, 1839)
Trifurcula josefklimeschi van Nieukerken, 1990
Trifurcula luteola van Nieukerken, 1990
Trifurcula orientella Klimesch, 1953
Trifurcula pallidella (Duponchel, 1843)
Trifurcula serotinella Herrich-Schaffer, 1855
Trifurcula silviae van Nieukerken, 1990
Trifurcula squamatella Stainton, 1849
Trifurcula subnitidella (Duponchel, 1843)

Family Noctuidae

Abrostola agnorista Dufay, 1956
Abrostola asclepiadis (Denis & Schiffermuller, 1775)
Abrostola tripartita (Hufnagel, 1766)
Abrostola triplasia (Linnaeus, 1758)
Acontia lucida (Hufnagel, 1766)
Acontia trabealis (Scopoli, 1763)
Acontia viridisquama Guenee, 1852
Acosmetia caliginosa (Hübner, 1813)
Acronicta aceris (Linnaeus, 1758)
Acronicta leporina (Linnaeus, 1758)
Acronicta strigosa (Denis & Schiffermuller, 1775)
Acronicta alni (Linnaeus, 1767)
Acronicta cuspis (Hübner, 1813)
Acronicta psi (Linnaeus, 1758)
Acronicta tridens (Denis & Schiffermuller, 1775)
Acronicta auricoma (Denis & Schiffermuller, 1775)
Acronicta euphorbiae (Denis & Schiffermuller, 1775)
Acronicta menyanthidis (Esper, 1789)
Acronicta rumicis (Linnaeus, 1758)
Actebia praecox (Linnaeus, 1758)
Actebia fugax (Treitschke, 1825)
Actinotia polyodon (Clerck, 1759)
Actinotia radiosa (Esper, 1804)
Aedia funesta (Esper, 1786)
Aedia leucomelas (Linnaeus, 1758)
Agrochola lychnidis (Denis & Schiffermuller, 1775)
Agrochola helvola (Linnaeus, 1758)
Agrochola humilis (Denis & Schiffermuller, 1775)
Agrochola litura (Linnaeus, 1758)
Agrochola meridionalis (Staudinger, 1871)
Agrochola nitida (Denis & Schiffermuller, 1775)
Agrochola pistacinoides (d'Aubuisson, 1867)
Agrochola haematidea (Duponchel, 1827)
Agrochola blidaensis (Stertz, 1915)
Agrochola lota (Clerck, 1759)
Agrochola macilenta (Hübner, 1809)
Agrochola laevis (Hübner, 1803)
Agrochola circellaris (Hufnagel, 1766)
Agrotis alexandriensis Baker, 1894
Agrotis bigramma (Esper, 1790)
Agrotis catalaunensis (Milliere, 1873)
Agrotis chretieni (Dumont, 1903)
Agrotis cinerea (Denis & Schiffermuller, 1775)
Agrotis clavis (Hufnagel, 1766)
Agrotis endogaea Boisduval, 1834
Agrotis exclamationis (Linnaeus, 1758)
Agrotis fatidica (Hübner, 1824)
Agrotis graslini Rambur, 1848
Agrotis ipsilon (Hufnagel, 1766)
Agrotis obesa Boisduval, 1829
Agrotis puta (Hübner, 1803)
Agrotis ripae Hübner, 1823
Agrotis schawerdai Bytinski-Salz, 1937
Agrotis segetum (Denis & Schiffermuller, 1775)
Agrotis simplonia (Geyer, 1832)
Agrotis spinifera (Hübner, 1808)
Agrotis trux (Hübner, 1824)
Agrotis turatii Standfuss, 1888
Agrotis vestigialis (Hufnagel, 1766)
Allophyes corsica (Spuler, 1905)
Allophyes oxyacanthae (Linnaeus, 1758)
Alvaradoia disjecta (Rothschild, 1920)
Alvaradoia numerica (Boisduval, 1840)
Amephana anarrhini (Duponchel, 1840)
Amephana aurita (Fabricius, 1787)
Ammoconia caecimacula (Denis & Schiffermuller, 1775)
Ammoconia senex (Geyer, 1828)
Ammopolia witzenmanni (Standfuss, 1890)
Amphipoea fucosa (Freyer, 1830)
Amphipoea lucens (Freyer, 1845)
Amphipoea oculea (Linnaeus, 1761)
Amphipyra berbera Rungs, 1949
Amphipyra effusa Boisduval, 1828
Amphipyra livida (Denis & Schiffermuller, 1775)
Amphipyra perflua (Fabricius, 1787)
Amphipyra pyramidea (Linnaeus, 1758)
Amphipyra tetra (Fabricius, 1787)
Amphipyra tragopoginis (Clerck, 1759)
Amphipyra cinnamomea (Goeze, 1781)
Anaplectoides prasina (Denis & Schiffermuller, 1775)
Anarta myrtilli (Linnaeus, 1761)
Anarta odontites (Boisduval, 1829)
Anarta pugnax (Hübner, 1824)
Anarta sodae (Rambur, 1829)
Anarta stigmosa (Christoph, 1887)
Anarta trifolii (Hufnagel, 1766)
Anorthoa munda (Denis & Schiffermuller, 1775)
Anthracia ephialtes (Hübner, 1822)
Antitype chi (Linnaeus, 1758)
Antitype suda (Geyer, 1832)
Apamea alpigena (Boisduval, 1837)
Apamea anceps (Denis & Schiffermuller, 1775)
Apamea aquila Donzel, 1837
Apamea crenata (Hufnagel, 1766)
Apamea epomidion (Haworth, 1809)
Apamea furva (Denis & Schiffermuller, 1775)
Apamea illyria Freyer, 1846
Apamea lateritia (Hufnagel, 1766)
Apamea lithoxylaea (Denis & Schiffermuller, 1775)
Apamea maillardi (Geyer, 1834)
Apamea monoglypha (Hufnagel, 1766)
Apamea oblonga (Haworth, 1809)
Apamea platinea (Treitschke, 1825)
Apamea remissa (Hübner, 1809)
Apamea rubrirena (Treitschke, 1825)
Apamea scolopacina (Esper, 1788)
Apamea sordens (Hufnagel, 1766)
Apamea sublustris (Esper, 1788)
Apamea syriaca (Osthelder, 1933)
Apamea unanimis (Hübner, 1813)
Apamea zeta (Treitschke, 1825)
Aporophyla australis (Boisduval, 1829)
Aporophyla canescens (Duponchel, 1826)
Aporophyla lueneburgensis (Freyer, 1848)
Aporophyla nigra (Haworth, 1809)
Apterogenum ypsillon (Denis & Schiffermuller, 1775)
Archanara dissoluta (Treitschke, 1825)
Archanara neurica (Hübner, 1808)
Arenostola phragmitidis (Hübner, 1803)
Asteroscopus sphinx (Hufnagel, 1766)
Atethmia centrago (Haworth, 1809)
Athetis gluteosa (Treitschke, 1835)
Athetis pallustris (Hübner, 1808)
Athetis hospes (Freyer, 1831)
Athetis lepigone (Moschler, 1860)
Atypha pulmonaris (Esper, 1790)
Auchmis detersa (Esper, 1787)
Autographa aemula (Denis & Schiffermuller, 1775)
Autographa bractea (Denis & Schiffermuller, 1775)
Autographa gamma (Linnaeus, 1758)
Autographa jota (Linnaeus, 1758)
Autographa pulchrina (Haworth, 1809)
Axylia putris (Linnaeus, 1761)
Brachionycha nubeculosa (Esper, 1785)
Brachylomia viminalis (Fabricius, 1776)
Brithys crini (Fabricius, 1775)
Bryonycta pineti (Staudinger, 1859)
Bryophila galathea Milliere, 1875
Bryophila raptricula (Denis & Schiffermuller, 1775)
Bryophila ravula (Hübner, 1813)
Bryophila vandalusiae Duponchel, 1842
Bryophila domestica (Hufnagel, 1766)
Bryophila petrea Guenee, 1852
Calamia tridens (Hufnagel, 1766)
Calliergis ramosa (Esper, 1786)
Callopistria juventina (Stoll, 1782)
Callopistria latreillei (Duponchel, 1827)
Calophasia almoravida Graslin, 1863
Calophasia lunula (Hufnagel, 1766)
Calophasia opalina (Esper, 1793)
Calophasia platyptera (Esper, 1788)
Caradrina germainii (Duponchel, 1835)
Caradrina morpheus (Hufnagel, 1766)
Caradrina gilva (Donzel, 1837)
Caradrina ingrata Staudinger, 1897
Caradrina clavipalpis Scopoli, 1763
Caradrina flavirena Guenee, 1852
Caradrina fuscicornis Rambur, 1832
Caradrina noctivaga Bellier, 1863
Caradrina selini Boisduval, 1840
Caradrina aspersa Rambur, 1834
Caradrina kadenii Freyer, 1836
Caradrina montana Bremer, 1861
Caradrina proxima Rambur, 1837
Caradrina terrea Freyer, 1840
Cardepia sociabilis (de Graslin, 1850)
Celaena haworthii (Curtis, 1829)
Ceramica pisi (Linnaeus, 1758)
Cerapteryx graminis (Linnaeus, 1758)
Cerastis faceta (Treitschke, 1835)
Cerastis leucographa (Denis & Schiffermuller, 1775)
Cerastis rubricosa (Denis & Schiffermuller, 1775)
Charanyca trigrammica (Hufnagel, 1766)
Charanyca ferruginea (Esper, 1785)
Chersotis alpestris (Boisduval, 1837)
Chersotis anatolica (Draudt, 1936)
Chersotis andereggii (Boisduval, 1832)
Chersotis cuprea (Denis & Schiffermuller, 1775)
Chersotis cyrnea (Spuler, 1908)
Chersotis elegans (Eversmann, 1837)
Chersotis fimbriola (Esper, 1803)
Chersotis larixia (Guenee, 1852)
Chersotis margaritacea (Villers, 1789)
Chersotis multangula (Hübner, 1803)
Chersotis ocellina (Denis & Schiffermuller, 1775)
Chersotis oreina Dufay, 1984
Chersotis rectangula (Denis & Schiffermuller, 1775)
Chilodes maritima (Tauscher, 1806)
Chloantha hyperici (Denis & Schiffermuller, 1775)
Chrysodeixis acuta (Walker, 1858)
Chrysodeixis chalcites (Esper, 1789)
Clemathada calberlai (Staudinger, 1883)
Cleoceris scoriacea (Esper, 1789)
Cleonymia baetica (Rambur, 1837)
Cleonymia yvanii (Duponchel, 1833)
Coenobia rufa (Haworth, 1809)
Coenophila subrosea (Stephens, 1829)
Colocasia coryli (Linnaeus, 1758)
Conisania renati (Oberthur, 1890)
Conisania luteago (Denis & Schiffermuller, 1775)
Conistra alicia Lajonquiere, 1939
Conistra daubei (Duponchel, 1838)
Conistra gallica (Lederer, 1857)
Conistra intricata (Boisduval, 1829)
Conistra ligula (Esper, 1791)
Conistra rubiginosa (Scopoli, 1763)
Conistra vaccinii (Linnaeus, 1761)
Conistra veronicae (Hübner, 1813)
Conistra erythrocephala (Denis & Schiffermuller, 1775)
Conistra rubiginea (Denis & Schiffermuller, 1775)
Conistra staudingeri (Graslin, 1863)
Conistra torrida (Lederer, 1857)
Coranarta cordigera (Thunberg, 1788)
Cosmia trapezina (Linnaeus, 1758)
Cosmia diffinis (Linnaeus, 1767)
Cosmia pyralina (Denis & Schiffermuller, 1775)
Cosmia affinis (Linnaeus, 1767)
Craniophora ligustri (Denis & Schiffermuller, 1775)
Craniophora pontica (Staudinger, 1878)
Cryphia simulatricula (Guenee, 1852)
Cryphia algae (Fabricius, 1775)
Cryphia ochsi (Boursin, 1940)
Cryphia pallida (Baker, 1894)
Crypsedra gemmea (Treitschke, 1825)
Ctenoplusia accentifera (Lefebvre, 1827)
Cucullia absinthii (Linnaeus, 1761)
Cucullia argentea (Hufnagel, 1766)
Cucullia artemisiae (Hufnagel, 1766)
Cucullia asteris (Denis & Schiffermuller, 1775)
Cucullia calendulae Treitschke, 1835
Cucullia cemenelensis Boursin, 1923
Cucullia chamomillae (Denis & Schiffermuller, 1775)
Cucullia cineracea Freyer, 1841
Cucullia dracunculi (Hübner, 1813)
Cucullia formosa Rogenhofer, 1860
Cucullia gnaphalii (Hübner, 1813)
Cucullia lactucae (Denis & Schiffermuller, 1775)
Cucullia lucifuga (Denis & Schiffermuller, 1775)
Cucullia santolinae Rambur, 1834
Cucullia santonici (Hübner, 1813)
Cucullia tanaceti (Denis & Schiffermuller, 1775)
Cucullia umbratica (Linnaeus, 1758)
Cucullia xeranthemi Boisduval, 1840
Cucullia caninae Rambur, 1833
Cucullia lanceolata (Villers, 1789)
Cucullia lychnitis Rambur, 1833
Cucullia prenanthis Boisduval, 1840
Cucullia reisseri Boursin, 1933
Cucullia scrophulariae (Denis & Schiffermuller, 1775)
Cucullia scrophulariphaga Rambur, 1833
Cucullia scrophulariphila Staudinger, 1859
Cucullia verbasci (Linnaeus, 1758)
Dasypolia ferdinandi Ruhl, 1892
Dasypolia templi (Thunberg, 1792)
Deltote bankiana (Fabricius, 1775)
Deltote deceptoria (Scopoli, 1763)
Deltote uncula (Clerck, 1759)
Deltote pygarga (Hufnagel, 1766)
Denticucullus pygmina (Haworth, 1809)
Diachrysia chrysitis (Linnaeus, 1758)
Diachrysia chryson (Esper, 1789)
Diachrysia nadeja (Oberthur, 1880)
Diachrysia stenochrysis (Warren, 1913)
Diarsia brunnea (Denis & Schiffermuller, 1775)
Diarsia dahlii (Hübner, 1813)
Diarsia florida (F. Schmidt, 1859)
Diarsia guadarramensis (Boursin, 1928)
Diarsia mendica (Fabricius, 1775)
Diarsia rubi (Vieweg, 1790)
Dichagyris flammatra (Denis & Schiffermuller, 1775)
Dichagyris musiva (Hübner, 1803)
Dichagyris candelisequa (Denis & Schiffermuller, 1775)
Dichagyris celsicola (Bellier, 1859)
Dichagyris constanti (Milliere, 1860)
Dichagyris forcipula (Denis & Schiffermuller, 1775)
Dichagyris nigrescens (Hofner, 1888)
Dichagyris renigera (Hübner, 1808)
Dichagyris signifera (Denis & Schiffermuller, 1775)
Dichagyris vallesiaca (Boisduval, 1837)
Dichonia aeruginea (Hübner, 1808)
Dichonia convergens (Denis & Schiffermuller, 1775)
Dicycla oo (Linnaeus, 1758)
Diloba caeruleocephala (Linnaeus, 1758)
Dryobota labecula (Esper, 1788)
Dryobotodes tenebrosa (Esper, 1789)
Dryobotodes carbonis Wagner, 1931
Dryobotodes eremita (Fabricius, 1775)
Dryobotodes monochroma (Esper, 1790)
Dryobotodes roboris (Geyer, 1835)
Dypterygia scabriuscula (Linnaeus, 1758)
Egira conspicillaris (Linnaeus, 1758)
Elaphria venustula (Hübner, 1790)
Enargia paleacea (Esper, 1788)
Enterpia laudeti (Boisduval, 1840)
Epilecta linogrisea (Denis & Schiffermuller, 1775)
Epimecia ustula (Freyer, 1835)
Episema glaucina (Esper, 1789)
Episema grueneri Boisduval, 1837
Eremobia ochroleuca (Denis & Schiffermuller, 1775)
Eremohadena chenopodiphaga (Rambur, 1832)
Eremohadena halimi (Milliere, 1877)
Eucarta amethystina (Hübner, 1803)
Euchalcia bellieri (Kirby, 1900)
Euchalcia modestoides Poole, 1989
Euchalcia variabilis (Piller, 1783)
Eucoptocnemis optabilis (Boisduval, 1834)
Eugnorisma glareosa (Esper, 1788)
Eugnorisma depuncta (Linnaeus, 1761)
Eugraphe sigma (Denis & Schiffermuller, 1775)
Euplexia lucipara (Linnaeus, 1758)
Eupsilia transversa (Hufnagel, 1766)
Eurois occulta (Linnaeus, 1758)
Euxoa lidia (Stoll, 1782)
Euxoa aquilina (Denis & Schiffermuller, 1775)
Euxoa birivia (Denis & Schiffermuller, 1775)
Euxoa conspicua (Hübner, 1824)
Euxoa cos (Hübner, 1824)
Euxoa culminicola (Staudinger, 1870)
Euxoa cursoria (Hufnagel, 1766)
Euxoa decora (Denis & Schiffermuller, 1775)
Euxoa distinguenda (Lederer, 1857)
Euxoa eruta (Hübner, 1817)
Euxoa hastifera (Donzel, 1847)
Euxoa nigricans (Linnaeus, 1761)
Euxoa nigrofusca (Esper, 1788)
Euxoa obelisca (Denis & Schiffermuller, 1775)
Euxoa recussa (Hübner, 1817)
Euxoa temera (Hübner, 1808)
Euxoa tritici (Linnaeus, 1761)
Euxoa vitta (Esper, 1789)
Euxoa haverkampfi (Standfuss, 1893)
Evisa schawerdae Reisser, 1930
Globia algae (Esper, 1789)
Globia sparganii (Esper, 1790)
Gortyna borelii Pierret, 1837
Gortyna flavago (Denis & Schiffermuller, 1775)
Gortyna xanthenes Germar, 1842
Graphiphora augur (Fabricius, 1775)
Griposia aprilina (Linnaeus, 1758)
Hada plebeja (Linnaeus, 1761)
Hadena irregularis (Hufnagel, 1766)
Hadena perplexa (Denis & Schiffermuller, 1775)
Hadena ruetimeyeri Boursin, 1951
Hadena sancta (Staudinger, 1859)
Hadena silenes (Hübner, 1822)
Hadena adriana (Schawerda, 1921)
Hadena albimacula (Borkhausen, 1792)
Hadena bicruris (Hufnagel, 1766)
Hadena caesia (Denis & Schiffermuller, 1775)
Hadena clara (Staudinger, 1901)
Hadena compta (Denis & Schiffermuller, 1775)
Hadena confusa (Hufnagel, 1766)
Hadena consparcatoides (Schawerda, 1928)
Hadena filograna (Esper, 1788)
Hadena luteocincta (Rambur, 1834)
Hadena magnolii (Boisduval, 1829)
Hadena tephroleuca (Boisduval, 1833)
Haemerosia renalis (Hübner, 1813)
Hecatera bicolorata (Hufnagel, 1766)
Hecatera cappa (Hübner, 1809)
Hecatera corsica (Rambur, 1832)
Hecatera dysodea (Denis & Schiffermuller, 1775)
Helicoverpa armigera (Hübner, 1808)
Heliothis maritima Graslin, 1855
Heliothis nubigera Herrich-Schaffer, 1851
Heliothis ononis (Denis & Schiffermuller, 1775)
Heliothis peltigera (Denis & Schiffermuller, 1775)
Heliothis viriplaca (Hufnagel, 1766)
Helotropha leucostigma (Hübner, 1808)
Heterophysa dumetorum (Geyer, 1834)
Hoplodrina ambigua (Denis & Schiffermuller, 1775)
Hoplodrina blanda (Denis & Schiffermuller, 1775)
Hoplodrina hesperica Dufay & Boursin, 1960
Hoplodrina octogenaria (Goeze, 1781)
Hoplodrina respersa (Denis & Schiffermuller, 1775)
Hoplodrina superstes (Ochsenheimer, 1816)
Hydraecia micacea (Esper, 1789)
Hydraecia osseola Staudinger, 1882
Hydraecia petasitis Doubleday, 1847
Hyppa rectilinea (Esper, 1788)
Ipimorpha retusa (Linnaeus, 1761)
Ipimorpha subtusa (Denis & Schiffermuller, 1775)
Jodia croceago (Denis & Schiffermuller, 1775)
Lacanobia contigua (Denis & Schiffermuller, 1775)
Lacanobia suasa (Denis & Schiffermuller, 1775)
Lacanobia thalassina (Hufnagel, 1766)
Lacanobia aliena (Hübner, 1809)
Lacanobia blenna (Hübner, 1824)
Lacanobia oleracea (Linnaeus, 1758)
Lacanobia splendens (Hübner, 1808)
Lacanobia w-latinum (Hufnagel, 1766)
Lamprosticta culta (Denis & Schiffermuller, 1775)
Lamprotes c-aureum (Knoch, 1781)
Lasionycta imbecilla (Fabricius, 1794)
Lasionycta proxima (Hübner, 1809)
Lateroligia ophiogramma (Esper, 1794)
Lenisa geminipuncta (Haworth, 1809)
Leucania loreyi (Duponchel, 1827)
Leucania comma (Linnaeus, 1761)
Leucania joannisi Boursin & Rungs, 1952
Leucania obsoleta (Hübner, 1803)
Leucania punctosa (Treitschke, 1825)
Leucania putrescens (Hübner, 1824)
Leucania zeae (Duponchel, 1827)
Leucochlaena oditis (Hübner, 1822)
Lithophane consocia (Borkhausen, 1792)
Lithophane furcifera (Hufnagel, 1766)
Lithophane lamda (Fabricius, 1787)
Lithophane merckii (Rambur, 1832)
Lithophane ornitopus (Hufnagel, 1766)
Lithophane semibrunnea (Haworth, 1809)
Lithophane socia (Hufnagel, 1766)
Lithophane leautieri (Boisduval, 1829)
Litoligia literosa (Haworth, 1809)
Longalatedes elymi (Treitschke, 1825)
Lophoterges millierei (Staudinger, 1871)
Luperina dumerilii (Duponchel, 1826)
Luperina rubella (Duponchel, 1835)
Luperina testacea (Denis & Schiffermuller, 1775)
Lycophotia erythrina (Herrich-Schaffer, 1852)
Lycophotia molothina (Esper, 1789)
Lycophotia porphyrea (Denis & Schiffermuller, 1775)
Macdunnoughia confusa (Stephens, 1850)
Mamestra brassicae (Linnaeus, 1758)
Meganephria bimaculosa (Linnaeus, 1767)
Melanchra persicariae (Linnaeus, 1761)
Mesapamea remmi Rezbanyai-Reser, 1985
Mesapamea secalella Remm, 1983
Mesapamea secalis (Linnaeus, 1758)
Mesogona acetosellae (Denis & Schiffermuller, 1775)
Mesogona oxalina (Hübner, 1803)
Mesoligia furuncula (Denis & Schiffermuller, 1775)
Metopoceras felicina (Donzel, 1844)
Mniotype adusta (Esper, 1790)
Mniotype anilis (Boisduval, 1840)
Mniotype occidentalis Yela, Fibiger, Ronkay & Zilli, 2010
Mniotype satura (Denis & Schiffermuller, 1775)
Mniotype solieri (Boisduval, 1829)
Mniotype spinosa (Chretien, 1910)
Moma alpium (Osbeck, 1778)
Mormo maura (Linnaeus, 1758)
Mythimna riparia (Rambur, 1829)
Mythimna albipuncta (Denis & Schiffermuller, 1775)
Mythimna congrua (Hübner, 1817)
Mythimna ferrago (Fabricius, 1787)
Mythimna l-album (Linnaeus, 1767)
Mythimna litoralis (Curtis, 1827)
Mythimna conigera (Denis & Schiffermuller, 1775)
Mythimna impura (Hübner, 1808)
Mythimna pallens (Linnaeus, 1758)
Mythimna pudorina (Denis & Schiffermuller, 1775)
Mythimna straminea (Treitschke, 1825)
Mythimna turca (Linnaeus, 1761)
Mythimna vitellina (Hübner, 1808)
Mythimna prominens (Walker, 1856)
Mythimna unipuncta (Haworth, 1809)
Mythimna alopecuri (Boisduval, 1840)
Mythimna andereggii (Boisduval, 1840)
Mythimna sicula (Treitschke, 1835)
Naenia typica (Linnaeus, 1758)
Noctua comes Hübner, 1813
Noctua fimbriata (Schreber, 1759)
Noctua interjecta Hübner, 1803
Noctua interposita (Hübner, 1790)
Noctua janthe (Borkhausen, 1792)
Noctua janthina Denis & Schiffermuller, 1775
Noctua orbona (Hufnagel, 1766)
Noctua pronuba (Linnaeus, 1758)
Noctua tirrenica Biebinger, Speidel & Hanigk, 1983
Nonagria typhae (Thunberg, 1784)
Nyctobrya muralis (Forster, 1771)
Ochropleura leucogaster (Freyer, 1831)
Ochropleura plecta (Linnaeus, 1761)
Oligia fasciuncula (Haworth, 1809)
Oligia latruncula (Denis & Schiffermuller, 1775)
Oligia strigilis (Linnaeus, 1758)
Oligia versicolor (Borkhausen, 1792)
Olivenebula xanthochloris (Boisduval, 1840)
Omia cyclopea (Graslin, 1837)
Omia cymbalariae (Hübner, 1809)
Omphalophana antirrhinii (Hübner, 1803)
Opigena polygona (Denis & Schiffermuller, 1775)
Oria musculosa (Hübner, 1808)
Orthosia gracilis (Denis & Schiffermuller, 1775)
Orthosia opima (Hübner, 1809)
Orthosia cerasi (Fabricius, 1775)
Orthosia cruda (Denis & Schiffermuller, 1775)
Orthosia miniosa (Denis & Schiffermuller, 1775)
Orthosia populeti (Fabricius, 1775)
Orthosia incerta (Hufnagel, 1766)
Orthosia gothica (Linnaeus, 1758)
Oxicesta chamoenices (Herrich-Schaffer, 1845)
Oxicesta geographica (Fabricius, 1787)
Oxicesta serratae (Zerny, 1927)
Pabulatrix pabulatricula (Brahm, 1791)
Pachetra sagittigera (Hufnagel, 1766)
Panchrysia aurea (Hübner, 1803)
Panchrysia v-argenteum (Esper, 1798)
Panemeria tenebrata (Scopoli, 1763)
Panolis flammea (Denis & Schiffermuller, 1775)
Papestra biren (Goeze, 1781)
Paradiarsia punicea (Hübner, 1803)
Parastichtis suspecta (Hübner, 1817)
Pardoxia graellsi (Feisthamel, 1837)
Peridroma saucia (Hübner, 1808)
Perigrapha i-cinctum (Denis & Schiffermuller, 1775)
Perigrapha rorida Frivaldszky, 1835
Periphanes delphinii (Linnaeus, 1758)
Phlogophora meticulosa (Linnaeus, 1758)
Phlogophora scita (Hübner, 1790)
Photedes captiuncula (Treitschke, 1825)
Photedes dulcis (Oberthur, 1918)
Photedes extrema (Hübner, 1809)
Photedes fluxa (Hübner, 1809)
Photedes minima (Haworth, 1809)
Photedes morrisii (Dale, 1837)
Phragmatiphila nexa (Hübner, 1808)
Phyllophila obliterata (Rambur, 1833)
Plusia festucae (Linnaeus, 1758)
Plusia putnami (Grote, 1873)
Polia bombycina (Hufnagel, 1766)
Polia hepatica (Clerck, 1759)
Polia nebulosa (Hufnagel, 1766)
Polia serratilinea Ochsenheimer, 1816
Polychrysia moneta (Fabricius, 1787)
Polymixis lichenea (Hübner, 1813)
Polymixis argillaceago (Hübner, 1822)
Polymixis dubia (Duponchel, 1836)
Polymixis flavicincta (Denis & Schiffermuller, 1775)
Polymixis polymita (Linnaeus, 1761)
Polymixis rufocincta (Geyer, 1828)
Polymixis xanthomista (Hübner, 1819)
Polyphaenis sericata (Esper, 1787)
Protarchanara brevilinea (Fenn, 1864)
Protolampra sobrina (Duponchel, 1843)
Protoschinia scutosa (Denis & Schiffermuller, 1775)
Pseudenargia ulicis (Staudinger, 1859)
Pseudluperina pozzii (Curo, 1883)
Pseudozarba bipartita (Herrich-Schaffer, 1850)
Pyrrhia umbra (Hufnagel, 1766)
Raphia hybris (Hübner, 1813)
Recoropha canteneri (Duponchel, 1833)
Rhizedra lutosa (Hübner, 1803)
Rhyacia helvetina (Boisduval, 1833)
Rhyacia lucipeta (Denis & Schiffermuller, 1775)
Rhyacia simulans (Hufnagel, 1766)
Schinia cardui (Hübner, 1790)
Scotochrosta pulla (Denis & Schiffermuller, 1775)
Sedina buettneri (E. Hering, 1858)
Senta flammea (Curtis, 1828)
Sesamia cretica Lederer, 1857
Sesamia nonagrioides Lefebvre, 1827
Sideridis rivularis (Fabricius, 1775)
Sideridis kitti (Schawerda, 1914)
Sideridis reticulata (Goeze, 1781)
Sideridis lampra (Schawerda, 1913)
Sideridis turbida (Esper, 1790)
Simyra albovenosa (Goeze, 1781)
Simyra nervosa (Denis & Schiffermuller, 1775)
Spaelotis ravida (Denis & Schiffermuller, 1775)
Spaelotis senna (Freyer, 1829)
Spodoptera cilium Guenee, 1852
Spodoptera exigua (Hübner, 1808)
Spodoptera littoralis (Boisduval, 1833)
Standfussiana dalmata (Staudinger, 1901)
Standfussiana insulicola (Turati, 1919)
Standfussiana lucernea (Linnaeus, 1758)
Standfussiana nictymera (Boisduval, 1834)
Standfussiana wiskotti (Standfuss, 1888)
Stilbia anomala (Haworth, 1812)
Stilbia calberlae (Failla-Tedaldi, 1890)
Stilbia faillae Pungeler, 1918
Stilbia philopalis Graslin, 1852
Subacronicta megacephala (Denis & Schiffermuller, 1775)
Sympistis funebris (Hübner, 1809)
Sympistis nigrita (Boisduval, 1840)
Syngrapha ain (Hochenwarth, 1785)
Syngrapha devergens (Hübner, 1813)
Syngrapha hochenwarthi (Hochenwarth, 1785)
Syngrapha interrogationis (Linnaeus, 1758)
Synthymia fixa (Fabricius, 1787)
Teinoptera olivina (Herrich-Schaffer, 1852)
Thalpophila matura (Hufnagel, 1766)
Thalpophila vitalba (Freyer, 1834)
Tholera cespitis (Denis & Schiffermuller, 1775)
Tholera decimalis (Poda, 1761)
Thysanoplusia circumscripta (Freyer, 1831)
Thysanoplusia daubei (Boisduval, 1840)
Thysanoplusia orichalcea (Fabricius, 1775)
Tiliacea aurago (Denis & Schiffermuller, 1775)
Tiliacea citrago (Linnaeus, 1758)
Tiliacea sulphurago (Denis & Schiffermuller, 1775)
Trachea atriplicis (Linnaeus, 1758)
Trichoplusia ni (Hübner, 1803)
Trichosea ludifica (Linnaeus, 1758)
Trigonophora haasi (Staudinger, 1892)
Trigonophora crassicornis (Oberthur, 1918)
Trigonophora flammea (Esper, 1785)
Trigonophora jodea (Herrich-Schaffer, 1850)
Tyta luctuosa (Denis & Schiffermuller, 1775)
Ulochlaena hirta (Hübner, 1813)
Unchelea myodea (Rambur, 1858)
Valeria jaspidea (Villers, 1789)
Valeria oleagina (Denis & Schiffermuller, 1775)
Xanthia gilvago (Denis & Schiffermuller, 1775)
Xanthia icteritia (Hufnagel, 1766)
Xanthia ocellaris (Borkhausen, 1792)
Xanthia ruticilla (Esper, 1791)
Xanthia togata (Esper, 1788)
Xanthodes albago (Fabricius, 1794)
Xestia ashworthii (Doubleday, 1855)
Xestia c-nigrum (Linnaeus, 1758)
Xestia ditrapezium (Denis & Schiffermuller, 1775)
Xestia triangulum (Hufnagel, 1766)
Xestia alpicola (Zetterstedt, 1839)
Xestia rhaetica (Staudinger, 1871)
Xestia sincera (Herrich-Schaffer, 1851)
Xestia speciosa (Hübner, 1813)
Xestia viridescens (Turati, 1919)
Xestia agathina (Duponchel, 1827)
Xestia baja (Denis & Schiffermuller, 1775)
Xestia castanea (Esper, 1798)
Xestia cohaesa (Herrich-Schaffer, 1849)
Xestia collina (Boisduval, 1840)
Xestia jordani (Turati, 1912)
Xestia kermesina (Mabille, 1869)
Xestia ochreago (Hübner, 1809)
Xestia sexstrigata (Haworth, 1809)
Xestia stigmatica (Hübner, 1813)
Xestia xanthographa (Denis & Schiffermuller, 1775)
Xylena solidaginis (Hübner, 1803)
Xylena exsoleta (Linnaeus, 1758)
Xylena vetusta (Hübner, 1813)
Xylocampa areola (Esper, 1789)

Family Nolidae

Bena bicolorana (Fuessly, 1775)
Earias clorana (Linnaeus, 1761)
Earias insulana (Boisduval, 1833)
Earias vernana (Fabricius, 1787)
Garella nilotica (Rogenhofer, 1882)
Meganola albula (Denis & Schiffermuller, 1775)
Meganola strigula (Denis & Schiffermuller, 1775)
Meganola togatulalis (Hübner, 1796)
Nola aerugula (Hübner, 1793)
Nola chlamitulalis (Hübner, 1813)
Nola cicatricalis (Treitschke, 1835)
Nola confusalis (Herrich-Schaffer, 1847)
Nola cristatula (Hübner, 1793)
Nola cucullatella (Linnaeus, 1758)
Nola dresnayi (Warnecke, 1946)
Nola kruegeri (Turati, 1911)
Nola squalida Staudinger, 1871
Nola subchlamydula Staudinger, 1871
Nola thymula Milliere, 1867
Nycteola asiatica (Krulikovsky, 1904)
Nycteola columbana (Turner, 1925)
Nycteola degenerana (Hübner, 1799)
Nycteola revayana (Scopoli, 1772)
Nycteola siculana (Fuchs, 1899)
Pseudoips prasinana (Linnaeus, 1758)

Family Notodontidae

Cerura erminea (Esper, 1783)
Cerura vinula (Linnaeus, 1758)
Clostera anachoreta (Denis & Schiffermuller, 1775)
Clostera anastomosis (Linnaeus, 1758)
Clostera curtula (Linnaeus, 1758)
Clostera pigra (Hufnagel, 1766)
Dicranura ulmi (Denis & Schiffermuller, 1775)
Drymonia dodonaea (Denis & Schiffermuller, 1775)
Drymonia obliterata (Esper, 1785)
Drymonia querna (Denis & Schiffermuller, 1775)
Drymonia ruficornis (Hufnagel, 1766)
Drymonia velitaris (Hufnagel, 1766)
Furcula bicuspis (Borkhausen, 1790)
Furcula bifida (Brahm, 1787)
Furcula furcula (Clerck, 1759)
Gluphisia crenata (Esper, 1785)
Harpyia milhauseri (Fabricius, 1775)
Leucodonta bicoloria (Denis & Schiffermuller, 1775)
Neoharpyia verbasci (Fabricius, 1798)
Notodonta dromedarius (Linnaeus, 1767)
Notodonta torva (Hübner, 1803)
Notodonta tritophus (Denis & Schiffermuller, 1775)
Notodonta ziczac (Linnaeus, 1758)
Odontosia carmelita (Esper, 1799)
Peridea anceps (Goeze, 1781)
Phalera bucephala (Linnaeus, 1758)
Phalera bucephaloides (Ochsenheimer, 1810)
Pheosia gnoma (Fabricius, 1776)
Pheosia tremula (Clerck, 1759)
Pterostoma palpina (Clerck, 1759)
Ptilodon cucullina (Denis & Schiffermuller, 1775)
Ptilophora plumigera (Denis & Schiffermuller, 1775)
Rhegmatophila alpina (Bellier, 1881)
Spatalia argentina (Denis & Schiffermuller, 1775)
Stauropus fagi (Linnaeus, 1758)
Thaumetopoea pinivora (Treitschke, 1834)
Thaumetopoea pityocampa (Denis & Schiffermuller, 1775)
Thaumetopoea processionea (Linnaeus, 1758)

Family Oecophoridae

Alabonia geoffrella (Linnaeus, 1767)
Alabonia staintoniella (Zeller, 1850)
Aplota nigricans (Zeller, 1852)
Aplota palpella (Haworth, 1828)
Batia inexpectella Jackh, 1972
Batia internella Jackh, 1972
Batia lambdella (Donovan, 1793)
Batia lunaris (Haworth, 1828)
Bisigna procerella (Denis & Schiffermuller, 1775)
Borkhausenia fuscescens (Haworth, 1828)
Borkhausenia minutella (Linnaeus, 1758)
Borkhausenia nefrax Hodges, 1974
Buvatina tineiformis Leraut, 1984
Crassa tinctella (Hübner, 1796)
Crassa unitella (Hübner, 1796)
Dasycera oliviella (Fabricius, 1794)
Decantha borkhausenii (Zeller, 1839)
Denisia albimaculea (Haworth, 1828)
Denisia augustella (Hübner, 1796)
Denisia fuscicapitella Huemer, 2001
Denisia graslinella (Staudinger, 1871)
Denisia luctuosella (Duponchel, 1840)
Denisia muellerrutzi (Amsel, 1939)
Denisia nubilosella (Herrich-Schaffer, 1854)
Denisia pyrenaica Leraut, 1989
Denisia ragonotella (Constant, 1885)
Denisia rhaetica (Frey, 1856)
Denisia similella (Hübner, 1796)
Denisia stipella (Linnaeus, 1758)
Denisia stroemella (Fabricius, 1779)
Denisia subaquilea (Stainton, 1849)
Endrosis sarcitrella (Linnaeus, 1758)
Epicallima bruandella (Ragonot, 1889)
Epicallima formosella (Denis & Schiffermuller, 1775)
Esperia sulphurella (Fabricius, 1775)
Goidanichiana jourdheuillella (Ragonot, 1875)
Harpella forficella (Scopoli, 1763)
Herrichia excelsella Staudinger, 1871
Hofmannophila pseudospretella (Stainton, 1849)
Holoscolia huebneri Kocak, 1980
Kasyniana diminutella (Rebel, 1931)
Metalampra cinnamomea (Zeller, 1839)
Minetia adamczewskii (Toll, 1956)
Minetia criella (Treitschke, 1835)
Minetia crinitus (Fabricius, 1798)
Oecophora bractella (Linnaeus, 1758)
Pleurota aristella (Linnaeus, 1767)
Pleurota bicostella (Clerck, 1759)
Pleurota ericella (Duponchel, 1839)
Pleurota gallicella Huemer & Luquet, 1995
Pleurota honorella (Hübner, 1813)
Pleurota metricella (Zeller, 1847)
Pleurota planella (Staudinger, 1859)
Pleurota protasella Staudinger, 1883
Pleurota proteella Staudinger, 1880
Pleurota pungitiella Herrich-Schaffer, 1854
Pleurota pyropella (Denis & Schiffermuller, 1775)
Pleurota punctella (O. Costa, 1836)
Schiffermuelleria schaefferella (Linnaeus, 1758)
Schiffermuelleria grandis (Desvignes, 1842)

Family Opostegidae

Opostega salaciella (Treitschke, 1833)
Opostega spatulella Herrich-Schaffer, 1855
Opostegoides menthinella (Mann, 1855)
Pseudopostega auritella (Hübner, 1813)
Pseudopostega chalcopepla (Walsingham, 1908)
Pseudopostega crepusculella (Zeller, 1839)

References 

Moths